André-Joseph Allar (22 August 1845 – 11 April 1926) was a French sculptor.

Biography
André-Joseph Allar was born in Toulon on 22 August 1845.

He became a successful sculptor after training under Antoine Laurent Dantan and Pierre-Jules Cavelier. Allar is best known for his small-scale work and architectural designs with majority of his work situated at the local museum in Toulon, including 'Hercules finding his dead son'. His artworks on Hercules is evidently inspired by the Greek hero, but in particular, the stories that depict the character as a saviour. His architectural features include his works in the Palacio Legislativo Federal with Laurent Marqueste and in the Palacio de Bellas Artes in Mexico City. Another one of his famous works is the statue of law displayed on the façade Palace of Justice, Rome.

In addition to his career as an artist, Allar joined the Legion of Honour as an officer in 1896 and the French Institute in 1905. He won various prizes but most notably the Prix de Rome in 1869 for his sculpture, and later became a member of the Académie des Beaux-Arts on 20 May 1905.

He died in Toulon on 11 April 1926. A street in Marseille has been named in his honor.

Main works
 Hécube découvrant le cadavre de Polydore, musée des Beaux-Arts à Marseille
 La mort d’Alceste, inspired by his wife's death, Lisieux
 Enfant des Abruzzes, musée d'Orsay
 Thétis portant les armes d’Achille
 Buste de Montricher, gallery of the palais Longchamp in Marseille
 Sainte Madeleine on the facade of the Cathedral de la Major in Marseille
 Monument de la Fédération on the place de la République in Toulon.
 Fontaine de la place Estrangin, Marseille
 Fontaine de la place Castellane, Marseille, in collaboration with Jules Cantini
 Portrait de son frère Gaudensi, museum of Toulon
 Statues de Jean Bullant et de Jean Goujon, on the front of the Mairie de Paris
 Statue de Frédéric Le Play, Jardin du Luxembourg, Paris
 The Youth and The Virile Age sculptures in the Palacio de Bellas Artes in Mexico City, Mexico
 Monument du Centenaire, Nice

Gallery

References

 Académie de Marseille, Dictionnaire des marseillais, Edisud, Marseille, 2001,
 Paul Masson, Encyclopédie des Bouches-du-Rhône, Archives départementales, Marseille, 17 volumes, from 1913 to 1937
 Adrien Blés, Dictionnaire historique des rues de Marseille, Jeanne Laffitte ed., Marseille, 1989,.
 Bruno Wuillequiey, Denise Jasmin, Luc Georget, Bénédicte Ottinger, Florence Dagousset and Gilles Mihière, Régis Bertrand, Marseille au XIXe, rêves et triomphes, Musées de Marseille (16 November 1991 – 15 February 1992),
 Régine Allar, La dynastie des Allar, Revue Marseille, 1982, N° 130, pages 138-143

External links

1845 births
1926 deaths
Artists from Toulon
Sculptors from Marseille
Members of the Académie des beaux-arts
Officiers of the Légion d'honneur
Prix de Rome for sculpture
20th-century French sculptors
20th-century French male artists
19th-century French sculptors
French male sculptors
19th-century French male artists